Charles Biddle Shepard (December 5, 1808 – October 25, 1843) was a Congressional Representative from North Carolina; born in New Bern, North Carolina, December 5, 1808; attended private schools of his native city and graduated from the University of North Carolina at Chapel Hill in 1827; studied law; was admitted to the bar in 1828 and commenced practice in New Bern, N.C.; elected to the State house of representatives to fill out the unexpired term of Jesse Speight and served in 1831 and 1832; elected as a Whig to the Twenty-fifth Congress and reelected as a Democrat to the Twenty-sixth Congress (March 4, 1837 – March 3, 1841); resumed the practice of his profession; died in New Bern, N.C., October 25, 1843; interment in Cedar Grove Cemetery.

See also

 Twenty-fifth United States Congress
 Twenty-sixth United States Congress

References

External links
 U.S. Congressional Biographical Directory
 

1808 births
University of North Carolina at Chapel Hill alumni
1843 deaths
Members of the North Carolina House of Representatives
North Carolina Democrats
Politicians from New Bern, North Carolina
Whig Party members of the United States House of Representatives from North Carolina
19th-century American politicians